Joseph Egan (born 18 October 1946) is a Scottish singer-songwriter.

Early career
Egan was born into an Irish Catholic family in Paisley in Renfrewshire, Scotland. Along with former St Mirin's Academy schoolmate Gerry Rafferty, he played in various smaller British bands, such as The Sensors and The Maverix, and worked as a session musician.

Stealers Wheel
In 1972, he and Rafferty founded the folk/rock band Stealers Wheel. After two unsuccessful singles, their song "Stuck in the Middle With You"—co-written by the two—became a hit in 1973, and reached the Top Ten of both the UK Singles Chart and the US Billboard Hot 100 chart. Subsequently, the band had a few smaller successes, among others, with the Egan-penned song "Star", but stagnating sales figures and artistic differences finally led to the band's break-up in 1975.

Solo work
Egan and Rafferty were contractually obliged not to release any recordings for three years; eventually Egan recorded a solo debut album, Out of Nowhere, in 1979. He registered a minor hit with his first single release "Back on the Road", and that same year released a second single titled "Out Of Nowhere".

1981 saw the release of his second album, Map, which was not a critical or commercial success, and subsequently no singles were released in support of it. After this he did not release any new recordings and left the music industry, though he did briefly reunite with Rafferty to perform vocals on some tracks on the latter's 1992 album On a Wing and a Prayer.

After the music business
As of 2005, Egan lived in Renfrewshire and ran a publishing company from home.

Discography

Albums
 1979: Out of Nowhere
 1981: Map

References

1946 births
Living people
British soft rock musicians
Musicians from Paisley, Renfrewshire
People educated at St Mirin's Academy
Scottish people of Irish descent
Scottish session musicians
Scottish singer-songwriters